Howard Eastwood (November 24, 1884 – January 12, 1976) was a justice of the New Jersey Supreme Court from 1946 to 1948.

He was a member of the New Jersey Senate from Burlington County (1940–1944) serving as president in 1944 before resigning.

He was New Jersey Circuit judge from 1944 to 1946 and Associate Justice of New Jersey Supreme Court from 1946 to 1948.

His spouse was Rebecca Ivins Harmer Eastwood.

Eastwood is buried at Odd Fellows Cemetery and Mausoleum in Burlington, New Jersey.

See also
List of justices of the Supreme Court of New Jersey
New Jersey Court of Errors and Appeals
Courts of New Jersey

References

1884 births
1976 deaths
Justices of the Supreme Court of New Jersey
Presidents of the New Jersey Senate
People from Burlington, New Jersey
20th-century American judges
20th-century American politicians